Rosalind Anne Segal (born 1958) is an American neurobiologist. She is a Professor of Neurobiology at Harvard Medical School and the Co-Chair of the Cancer Biology Department at the Dana Farber Cancer Institute. Segal's work employs modern methods of cell and molecular biology to study the development of the mammalian brain with the goal of understanding how disruption of this normal process leads to the formation of brain malignancies.

Biography 
Segal graduated with a Bachelor of Arts degree in 1979 jointly awarded by Harvard College and Radcliffe College. In 1986, she received both an MD from Weill Cornell Medicine and a PhD from Rockefeller University. She performed her doctoral dissertation research in the laboratory of David Luck, and her residency training in neurology in the Harvard affiliated hospitals in the Longwood Medical Area. Segal completed postdoctoral research in molecular neuroscience in the laboratories of Ronald McKay and Charles Stiles. In 1994, she started her own laboratory at Harvard Medical School's Beth Israel Deaconess Medical Center. She moved the laboratory to the site of the Dana–Farber Cancer Institute in 1998.

Research 
Segal's research focuses on critical extracellular factors that control the development of the nervous system, from neural stem cells to functional neural circuits.   A major focus has been the sonic hedgehog (Shh) signaling pathway.  Segal defined the motif within Hedgehog proteins critical for binding to proteoglycans, defined the nature of the proteoglycan that serves as a selective Shh receptor, and demonstrated that proteoglycan interactions are needed for a proliferative response to Shh.  Mutations that activate Shh signaling cause brain tumors and other malignancies, and thus these studies have provided new approaches for developing therapeutics for treating brain tumors.

Her research has also investigated later stages of brain development when precursor cells migrate away from the stem cell niche where they are born, proliferate, and eventually exit the cell cycle and take on the properties of neurons. Segal and her colleagues identified a factor brain-derived neurotrophic factor (BDNF) as a chemotactic factor that controls neuron migration.  Once neurons have migrated to their final destination and become incorporated into functional neural circuits, she has shown that BDNF,  and its close relative nerve growth factor (NGF),  work together to maintain circuit function.  Segal has demonstrated that BDNF and NGF are transported from the outside of a cell to the cell's interior via signaling endosomes that function as critical mediators of cell survival within mature neural circuits.  Segal has also revealed a role for the local translation of select mRNAs at synapses to promote neural circuit survival and function.

Academic leadership and awards 
In addition to her research, a major emphasis of Segal's professional life has been devoted toward the education of the next generation of neuroscientists. She has served as a faculty advisor in science at Radcliffe College. She is also the co-chair of the Department of Cancer Biology at Dana Farber Cancer Institute, as well as the Director of Harvard's PhD Program in Neuroscience. She has mentored numerous graduate students and post-doctoral fellows, and serves as a faculty advisor for the Harvard Women in Neuroscience program.

She is the recipient of a number of awards that recognize her teaching and research accomplishments including the Robert Ebert Clinical Scholar's Award from the Klingenstein Foundation, a McDonnell Foundation Award from the James S. McDonnell Foundation, the National Institutes of Health Director's Pioneer Award in 2006,  and the Casty Family Award for Achievement in Mentoring. She was awarded a two-year $250,000 grant from Alex's Lemonade Stand Foundation in 2014. In 2017, she won the Harold Amos Faculty Diversity Award from Harvard Medical School.

Selected works

External links
Harvard Medical School faculty page

References 

American women neuroscientists
1958 births
Radcliffe College alumni
Harvard University faculty
American neuroscientists
Developmental neuroscience
American oncologists
Women oncologists
Living people
Weill Cornell Medical College alumni
American women academics
21st-century American women